The All is One Tour was the thirty-first concert tour by American rock group Santana in 2002. According to Billboard, the North American tours grossed $16,821,175, 426,431 out of 640,106 tickets were sold, and 7 concerts sold out.

Touring personnel

Band:
 Carlos Santana – lead guitar, percussion, vocals
 Chester D. Thompson – keyboards
 Benny Rietveld – bass guitar
 Karl Perazzo – timbales, percussion, vocals
 Raul Rekow – congas, bongos, percussion, vocals
 Dennis Chambers – drums
 Tony Lindsay – lead vocals
 Andy Vargas – lead vocals
 Jeff Cresman – trombone
 Bill Ortiz – trumpet
 Myron Dove – rhythm guitar

Management:
 Kevin Chisholm – tour manager
 Adam Fells – assistant tour manager
 Mike Hoss Kiefer – production manager
 Chad Koehler – stage manager
 Andy "Lightman" Elias – lighting designer
 Chad Wilson – security
 Steve Brown – venue security

Production:
 Randy Piotroski – foh sound
 Brian Montgomery – monitors
 Jason Ruggles – sound engineer
 Jim Gaines - sound consultant

Crew:
 Ed Adair – guitar tech
 Dave Crockett – drum & percussion tech
 Chris "Stubby" McNair – bass & rhythm tech
 Rob Diaz – keyboard tech

Set list 
An average set list of this tour is as follows:

 "Day of Celebration" (Carlos Santana, Chester D. Thompson, Tony Lindsay)
 "Love of My Life" (Santana, Dave Matthews)
 "Put Your Lights On" (Erik Schrody)
 "Victory Is Won" (Santana)
 "Maria Maria" (Santana, Karl Perazzo, Raul Rekow, Wyclef Jean, Jerry Duplessis)
 "Africa Bamba" (Santana, Touré Kunda, Perazzo)
 "Aye Aye Aye"	(Michael Shrieve, Santana, Perazzo, Rekow)
 "Spiritual" (John Coltrane)
 "(Da Le) Yaleo" (Santana, Shakara Mutela, Christian Polloni)
 "Foo Foo" (Yvon André, Roger Eugène, Yves Joseph, Hermann Nau, Claude Jean)
 "Adouma" (Angélique Kidjo, Jean Hebrail)
 "Make Somebody Happy" (Santana, Alex Ligertwood)
 "Right On Be Free" (Charles "Chuck" Griffin, Bernice Cole)
 "Get It in Your Soul"
 "Apache" (Jerry Lordan)
 "Smooth" (Itaal Shur, Rob Thomas)
 "Dame Tu Amor" (Abraham Quintanilla, Ricky Vela, Richard Brooks)
 "Black Magic Woman" (Peter Green)
 "Gypsy Queen" (Gábor Szabó)
Encore
 "Oye Como Va" (Tito Puente)
 "Jin-go-lo-ba" (Babatunde Olatunji)

Tour dates

U.S. leg (March 15 – April 2)

European leg (May 16 – June 16)

North American leg (July 31 – October 12)

Box office score data

Notes

References

External links 
 Santana Past Shows 2002 at Santana official website

Santana (band) concert tours
2002 concert tours
Concert tours of North America
Concert tours of Europe